The American Wrestling Federation was a professional wrestling promotion based in Chicago, Illinois from 1994 to 1996. Former employees in the AWF consisted of professional wrestlers, managers, play-by-play and color commentators, announcers, interviewers and referees.

Alumni

Male wrestlers

Stables and tag teams

Managers and valets

Commentators and interviewers

Referees

Other personnel

References
General

Specific

External links
American Wrestling Federation alumni at Cagematch.net
American Wrestling Federation alumni at OWW.com
American Wrestling Federation alumni at Wrestlingdata.com

American Wrestling Federation alumni